Subrata Banerjee (3 May 1945 – 19 August 2016) was an Indian cricket umpire. He stood in thirteen One Day International matches between 1983 and 1998.

See also
 List of One Day International cricket umpires

References

1945 births
2016 deaths
Indian One Day International cricket umpires
Place of birth missing